Potts (and Pott) is a surname of English origin. The word potts refers to circular hollows in the ground.

Notable people with the name include:
Alec Potts (born 1996), Australian archer 
Alistair Potts (born 1971), British rower
Allan Potts (1904–1952), American speed skater
Allan Potts (athletics) (1934–2014), New Zealand athlete, coach, and administrator
Alpheus Potts (1838–1911), American lawyer, judge, and politician
Andrew Potts (disambiguation), several people
Anna M. Longshore Potts (1829–1912), American physician
Annie Potts (born 1952), American actress
Arnold Potts (1896–1968), Australian Brigadier and grazier
Arthur Potts (disambiguation), several people
Barbara Potts (born 1932), American politician
Benjamin F. Potts (1836–1887), American lawyer, politician, and soldier
Bill Potts (musician) (1928–2005), American jazz pianist and arranger
Bill Potts (lawyer) (born ?), Australian lawyer
Bradley Potts (born 1994), British footballer
Cameron Potts (born 1971), Australian rock musician
Carl Potts (born 1952), American comic-book writer, artist, and editor
Charles Potts (born 1943), American projectivist poet
Cliff Potts (born 1942), American actor
Daddy Potts (1898–1981), American football player
David Potts (disambiguation), several people
Denys Campion Potts (1923–2016), English modern linguist 
Ebinabo Potts-Johnson (born 1988), Nigerian beauty pageant contestant and model
Edward Potts (disambiguation), several people
Eric Potts (born 1965), British actor
Frank Potts (disambiguation), several people
Frederick Potts (disambiguation), several people
Gareth Potts (born 1983), British pool player
Gary Potts (1945–2020), chief of the Temagami First Nation and the Teme-Augama Anishnabai
Geoffrey Potts, American cognitive psychologist and professor
Harry Potts (1920–1996), English football player and manager
Jason Potts (economist) (born ?), New Zealand-born Australian academic economist
Jason Potts (politician) (born 1978), American politician
Jerry Potts (1840–1896), Canadian Métis guide and interpreter
Joe Potts, Scottish race car driver and constructor
Joe Potts (footballer) (1889–1980), English footballer
John Potts (disambiguation), several people
Laramie Potts, American civil and environmental engineer, scientist, and educator
Leonard Potts (1897–1960), English academic and translator
Lisa Potts, English schoolteacher, public health nurse, and author; injured defending children in her care from a machete attack
Malcolm Potts, British-born American physician, reproductive scientist, author, and professor
Marie Mason Potts (1895–1978), Mountain Maidu journalist and activist
Michael Potts or Mike Potts (disambiguation), several people
Midge Potts, American peace activist and politician
Olivia Potts, British cookery writer
Paul Potts  (born 1970), British tenor who won the first series of ITV's Britain's Got Talent in 2007
Paul Potts (writer) (1911–1990), poet, author of Dante Called You Beatrice
Robin Buxton Potts, Canadian politician
Reg Potts (1927–1996), English footballer
Reginald Potts (born 1892), British gymnast
Renfrey Potts (1925–2005), Australian mathematician
Richard Potts (1753–1808), American politician and jurist
Roosevelt Potts (born 1971), American football player
Russ Potts (born 1939), American businessman and politician
Ruan Potts (born 1977), South African mixed martial artist
Sarah-Jane Potts (born 1976), British actress
Seán Potts (1930–2014), Irish musician
Steve Potts (disambiguation), several people
Taylor Potts (born 1987), American football player
Templin Potts (1855–1927), American naval officer and Naval Governor of Guam
Thomas Potts (disambiguation), several people
Tony Potts (born 1963), American television presenter
Tony Potts (politician) (born 1976/77), American politician
Travon Potts (born 1970), American songwriter and producer
Wallace Potts (1947–2006), American film director, screenwriter, and archivist
William Potts (disambiguation), several people

Characters
Bill Potts (Doctor Who), a character in Doctor Who
Caractacus Potts, a character in Chitty Chitty Bang Bang
Clytie Potts, a character in Philip Reeve's Mortal Engines Quartet
Douglas Potts, a character on the ITV soap opera Emmerdale'
Hilary Potts, a character on the ITV soap opera EmmerdalePepper Potts, a character in the Marvel Comics universe
Sarah Potts (character), a character on the soap opera Shortland Street''

See also
 Pott, a surname
 Pott (disambiguation)

References

English-language surnames